Shimshon Holzman (variant name: Shimson Holzman; ; 1907–1986) was an Israeli landscape and figurative painter. He is known worldwide for his water color paintings.

Background
Holzman was born in 1907 in Sambir, Galicia. He immigrated to Mandate Palestine from Vienna, Austria in 1922, settled in Tel Aviv, and began working as a house painter with his father. In 1926, Holzman began private studies under Yitzhak Frenkel at the studio of painting arts of the Histadrut School where he also worked with Mordechai Levanon, Ziona Tajar, Avigdor Stematsky, Yehezkel Streichman, Moshe Castel, and Arie Aroch.

In 1929, he made his first of several influential visits to Paris, France. There, he studied at the Académie de la Grande Chaumière and exhibited frequently. Israeli art scholar Gideon Ofrat writes of Holzman's time in France: he "brought from Paris impeccably French interiors and landscapes in expressionistic oils, but replaced them with lighthearted aquarelles in the manner of Raoul Dufy and Henri Matisse." As a result of his studies under Frenkel - himself heavily influenced by the École de Paris - and lengthy stays in France, Holzman's oeuvre has a strong French undercurrent. He was deeply influenced by Matisse, and his colour palette evinces a marked Fauvist imprint. Gideon Ofrat further explains: "Holzman's landscapes (Galilean in the main) and characters (mostly Oriental) would convey optimism and mischievous gaiety; his sketch line, designed for a temperamentally rhythmic role, was overlaid with splotches of color, abstract and charmingly translucent."

Holzman was a founding member of the Artists' Quarter in Safed, represented Israel at the 1959 Venice Biennale, and participated in a group exhibition of Israeli artists at the opening of the Tel Aviv Museum of Art in 1932.

Holzman is considered a modern master of the watercolour medium. On the tradition of watercolour painting in Israel, Avishay Ayal of the University of Haifa explains: "originating in the early 15th century, this technique was a means for rapid sketching… In pre-State Palestine and in the early days of the State of Israel, aquarelle painting was a cheap and rapid method to disseminate art. Given the poverty that characterized the entire period, painting in watercolour and purchasing works on paper became a cheap, available option… Many of the Israeli abstract artists were great experts in watercolour painting." Ayal writes further: "several artists became known at the time mainly as aquarellists, and their works were highly popular during that period. The paintings of Joseph Kossonogi, Mordechai Avniel, and Shimshon Holzman are full of momentum, the color flows within extensive water stains, and they represent the spirit of an era rich in practice that looks to the future with optimism."

Holzman's orientalist-inspired works depicting Israeli land and seascapes and Bedouin, Arab, and Jewish life are highlights of mid-twentieth century Israeli painting.

He died in Tel Aviv in 1986.

Awards
In 1937, Holzman was a co-recipient of the first Dizengoff Prize, Israel's highest honour for contributions to the Arts. Holzman won the Haifa Municipality Prize in 1948 and was awarded the Dizengoff Prize a second time in 1959.

Selected exhibitions
 2004: University of Haifa Art Gallery, Haifa: Our Landscape: Notes on Landscape Painting in Israel (online catalogue)
 1991: The Open Museum, Tefen: A Summer Celebration: Paintings of the Israeli Landscape Artist Shimshon Holzman
 1964: Galerie Jacques Chalom, Paris: Figures & Landscapes of the Galilee
 1963: Temple Sinai, Washington: Seven Painters of Israel: Ardon, Castel, Holzman, Mokady, Rubin, Shemi & Steinhardt
 1954: Obelisk Gallery, Washington
 1951: Galerie Léon Marseille, Paris: Holzman: Paysages d'Israël

Selected collections
 Israel Museum, Jerusalem
 Tel Aviv Museum of Art

References

Further reading
 Ayal, Avishay, and Yoram Bar-Gal. Our Landscape: Notes on Landscape Painting in Israel [exhibition catalogue]. Haifa: University of Haifa Art Gallery, 2004.
 Holzman, Shimshon (Yaakov Orland, ed.). Eight Watercolour Drawings - Shemonah tsiyure akvarel [portfolio of colour plates]. 1967.
 Ofrat, Gideon. One Hundred Years of Art in Israel. Boulder: Westview Press, 1998.
 Zach, Natan. Shimshon Holzman: A Summer Celebration [exhibition catalogue]. Tefen: The Open Museum, 1991.

External links
 Shimshon Holzman at the Israeli Art Centre, Israel Museum, Jerusalem
 Shimshon Holzman at the Smithsonian Libraries Art & Artists Files

1907 births
1986 deaths
Jewish painters
20th-century Polish painters
20th-century Ukrainian painters
20th-century Ukrainian male artists
20th-century Polish male artists
Austrian emigrants to Israel
Alumni of the Académie de la Grande Chaumière
20th-century Israeli painters
People from Sambir
Ukrainian male painters